The 1975 Winston 500 was an automobile race at the Alabama International Motor Speedway held on May 4, 1975.

The tenth race of 30 in the 1975 NASCAR Winston Cup Grand National season, it started 50 cars and ran 500.1 miles.   It was the sixth annual late-April/early May running at Talladega and the fifth under Winston cigarettes sponsorship.

Background
Talladega Superspeedway, originally known as Alabama International Motor Superspeedway (AIMS), is a motorsports complex located north of Talladega, Alabama. It is located on the former Anniston Air Force Base in the small city of Lincoln. The track is a Tri-oval and was constructed by International Speedway Corporation, a business controlled by the France Family, in the 1960s. Talladega is most known for its steep banking and the unique location of the start/finish line - located just past the exit to pit road. The track currently hosts the NASCAR series such as the Sprint Cup Series, Xfinity Series, and the Camping World Truck Series.

Race report
Five-time Formula One World Driver Champion Juan Manuel Fangio (Argentina, 1951, 1954-57) was the honorary starter for the event. Ed Negre drove Dean Dalton's car, and Dean Dalton drove Ed Negre's car.

The pole and race were won by Buddy Baker, driving the 1975 Ford Torino of Bud Moore. Buddy Baker's win the first for Ford in NASCAR's "Modern Era." It snapped a long losing streak for the brand dating back to Bobby Allison's win at Middle Georgia Raceway back in November 1971. This race brought on the best finish of Harry Jefferson who finished in sixth place.

His primary challengers were Bobby Allison, David Pearson, Richard Petty, Dick Brooks, Dave Marcis, and Darrell Waltrip.  

The race lead changed 51 times among 11 drivers and was slowed by five cautions for 45 laps. There were several accidents. Baker dominated in terms of laps led, but he didn't have the best car. Cale Yarborough rocketed through the field from 24th starting spot until his windshield kept breaking. Petty was one of the best cars along with Pearson. Cecil "Flash" Gordon led a couple laps early in this race when he stayed out and the leaders pitted. The #24 Chevrolet wasn't upfront for long as Dick Brooks and Darrell Waltrip passed him not long after the restart. Gordon's good run eventually ended in a blown engine that saw him spun in his own oil and slide into the infield off Turn 4.

Donnie Allison blew his engine while leading Lap 12 and a two-car crash ensued; among those involved were Daytona 500 winner Benny Parsons. Later Marty Robbins was involved in a fiery crash with Ramo Stott and James Hylton. The worst accident happened to Richard Petty. On Lap 141 while leading his left-front wheel bearing caught fire. He pitted while his young brother-in-law Randy Owens was fitting a hose to a pressurized water tank; the tank exploded high into the air and landed several yards from Petty, killing Owens. Another unusual event was Darrell Waltrip finishing in the top five despite being put out with engine problems on lap 182. Baker crowded off a last-lap bid by Pearson for the win, his first since 1973 and the first for team owner Bud Moore since 1966.

The winner of the race won $28,275 ($ when adjusted for inflation) while the last-place driver walked away with $905 ($ when adjusted for inflation).

Top 10 finishers

Standings after the race

References

Winston 500
Winston 500
Winston 500
NASCAR races at Talladega Superspeedway